Ruth Elizabeth Harkness (21 September 1900 - 20 July 1947) was an American fashion designer and socialite who traveled to China in 1936 and brought out the first live giant panda to the United States - not in a cage or on a leash, but wrapped in her arms.

Harkness was born in Titusville, Pennsylvania, a daughter of Robert and Mary Ann (Patterson) McCombs. In 1934, her husband Bill Harkness had travelled to China in search of a panda, but died of throat cancer in Shanghai early in 1936.  His widow Ruth, then living in New York City, decided to complete the mission herself.

Harkness traveled to Shanghai, and with the help of a Chinese-American explorer named Quentin Young, and Gerald Russell, a British naturalist, launched her own panda mission.  After passing through Chongqing and Chengdu, the team arrived at a mountainous region, where, on 9 November 1936, they encountered and captured a nine-week-old panda cub.  The panda, which they named Su Lin after Young's sister-in-law, was bottle-fed baby formula on the journey back to Shanghai and the United States. Su lin meant the phrase `a little bit of something very cute`.  Quentin migrated to the US in later years and felt he never got credit for his work in finding the Panda.

The panda caused a great sensation in the American press and eventually ended up at the Brookfield Zoo in Chicago.

Harkness launched two subsequent expeditions in search of the giant panda. Harkness brought back a second panda, Mei-Mei, in 1937. She did not return with a giant panda on her third and final expedition.

Following her time in China and the success of her book about her adventure with Su Lin, The Baby Giant Panda. Harkness travelled to Peru, where she chronicled her adventures in Pangoan Diary, and Mexico, where she wrote for Gourmet magazine.

Harkness's friend was an editor at Gourmet and thus paid her for articles when possible.  Harkness was found dead suffering from alcoholism.

She last resided at the Chelsea Hotel in New York, New York. She died while staying at the Wm. Penn Hotel in Pittsburgh, Pennsylvania. Her remains were cremated and her ashes returned to Titusville, where they were interred in the Union Cemetery, beside her mother.

An IMAX film, China: The Panda Adventure, was made about her expedition in 2001. In 2016, Lady and the Panda, a theatrical film about Harkness written and directed by Justin Chadwick, was announced as in pre-production.  As of 2022, no subsequent updates have been made and the film is still listed as in-development.


Writing
Written by Ruth Harkness:
The Lady and the Panda : an Adventure, Carrick & Evans, New York, 1938.
The Baby Giant Panda, Carrick & Evans, New York, 1938.
Pangoan Diary, 1942.  A treatise on Peruvian Indians.
"Mexican Mornings" Gourmet, February 1947.

Bibliography

Chicago Brookfield Zoological Society, Chicago, Federici~Ross, Andrea, "Let the Lions Roar, History of the Brookfield Zoo"
Schaller, George B, New York Zoological Society, National Geographic magazine archive, Vol. 160. No.6, Dec. 1981, Vol 169, No. 3 March 1986
Brady, Erika,   Smithsonian Magazine, Vol. 14 Number 9, "First Panda Shanghaied in China, stirred up a Ruckas"
Kiefer, Michael, "Chasing the Giant Panda"  2002, 
Masloff, E.B. '" Panda Wishes", (2000)
Masloff, E.B., "A Time for Loving Part I II and III," published on www.FemExplorers.com (2002)
Croke, Vicki Constantine, The Lady and the Panda (2005).
Nicholls, Henry, "The Way of the Panda: The Curious History of China's Political Animal" (2010)

References

External links
Book
IMAX Film
IMDb page for 2016 announced The Lady and the Panda film

1900 births
1947 deaths
20th-century American businesspeople
20th-century American businesswomen